Clare Thompson (born 10 June 1963) is an Australian former professional tennis player.

Thompson spent the early years of her career in the United States, playing college tennis for the United States International University, which was based in San Diego.

Her professional career included an appearance at the 1988 Australian Open, where she received a wildcard into the main draw and played Janine Tremelling in the first round, with the winner to face top seed Steffi Graf. Thompson was beaten by Tremelling in three sets.

ITF finals

Singles: 2 (1–1)

Doubles: 5 (1–4)

References

External links
 
 

1963 births
Living people
Australian female tennis players
United States International Gulls
College women's tennis players in the United States